Fernando Bolea (born 29 May 1965) is a Spanish handball player. He competed in the men's tournament at the 1992 Summer Olympics.

References

1965 births
Living people
Spanish male handball players
Olympic handball players of Spain
Handball players at the 1992 Summer Olympics
Sportspeople from Zaragoza